Dasht-e Deh or Dasht Deh may refer to:
 Dasht-e Deh, Kerman
 Dasht Deh, Yazd